Bosnia and Herzegovina competed at the 1997 World Championships in Athletics from 1 – 10 August 1997.

Results

Men
Field events

Women
Track and road events

See also
 Bosnia and Herzegovina at the World Championships in Athletics

References

 Men High Jump Athletics VI World Championship 1997 Athens (GRE) - Wednesday 06.08 - Gold Medal: Javier Sotomayor, Cuba
 Women 400m Athletics VI World Championship 1997 Athens (GRE) - Monday 04.08 - Gold Medal: Cathy Freeman, Australia

External links
Official local organising committee website
Official IAAF competition website

Nations at the 1997 World Championships in Athletics
World Championships in Athletics
1997